William Henry Reilly (May 9, 1868 – June 12, 1938), was a professional baseball player who played second base in the Major Leagues for the 1896 Chicago Colts. He played in the minor leagues from 1890 through 1903, primarily in various western leagues. He also managed in the minors in 1903 and 1904.

Sources

Chicago Colts players
Baseball players from California
Major League Baseball second basemen
1868 births
1938 deaths
19th-century baseball players
Minor league baseball managers
San Francisco Haverlys players
Oakland Colonels players
Marinette Badgers players
Oakland Morans players
San Francisco Friscos players
Nashville Tigers players
New Orleans Pelicans (baseball) players
Fort Worth Panthers players
Imperials of San Francisco players
Springfield Governors players
Fargo Divorcees players
San Francisco Athletics players
Oakland Oaks (baseball) players
Portland Browns players
Sacramento Senators players